Eraldo Pecci (born 12 April 1955) is an Italian writer, pundit, and former footballer, who played as a midfielder.

Club career
During his club career, Pecci played for Bologna, Fiorentina, S.S.C. Napoli and Torino, winning a Coppa Italia with Bologna, and a Serie A title with Torino.

International career
Pecci represented the Italy national football team on 6 occasions between 1975 and 1978, and he was a member of the 1978 FIFA World Cup squad, during which Italy managed a fourth-place finish.

Honours

Club
Bologna
Coppa Italia: 1973–74

Torino
Serie A: 1975–76

References

External links

1955 births
Living people
Italian footballers
Italy under-21 international footballers
Italy international footballers
1978 FIFA World Cup players
Bologna F.C. 1909 players
Torino F.C. players
ACF Fiorentina players
S.S.C. Napoli players
L.R. Vicenza players
Serie A players
Serie B players
Association football midfielders